Nazanin Afshin-Jam (Nāzanin Afŝin Jam, born April 11, 1979) is an Iranian-Canadian human rights activist, author and public speaker. She is a former Miss World Canada. She is also president and co-founder of Stop Child Executions as well as the founder of "The Nazanin Foundation".  She immigrated to Canada with her family in 1981. She is married to Peter MacKay, former Minister of Justice and Attorney General of Canada.

Childhood 

Nazanin Afshin-Jam was born on April 11, 1979, in Tehran, Iran. Her father was the head of the Sheraton Hotel in Tehran (now the Tehran Homa Hotel) which was frequented by Westerners. During the Iranian revolution, her father was jailed by the Revolutionary Guard. After he was freed from prison, he fled Iran with his family to Spain, and after a year they moved to Canada as immigrants, settling in Vancouver.

Education and Red Cross work
Afshin-Jam graduated from the University of British Columbia with degrees in international relations and political science.

In 2011, she earned her Master of Arts in Diplomacy from Norwich University.

She has an honorary doctorate of laws from the University of Western Ontario.

 Following her graduation, Afshin-Jam served with the Red Cross as a Global Youth Educator, becoming involved in such matters as land mines, children and war, the poverty-disease cycle, and natural disasters.

Miss World competition
In 2003, Afshin-Jam became Miss World Canada and joined in the Miss World contest in Sanya, China, where she placed second.

Activism and awards
Afshin-Jam was opposed to the death penalty being applied to 18-year-old Iranian woman Nazanin Mahabad Fatehi, who was sentenced to hang for stabbing one of three men who tried to rape her and her niece in Karaj in March 2005. She started a campaign to help save the life of this minor including a petition which attracted more than 350,000 signatures worldwide. She has also dedicated her song Someday, one of the twelve songs on her similarly titled album Someday to Nazanin Fatehi. Eventually, with pressure from the international community, Nazanin Fatehi was granted a new trial by the head of Judiciary in June 2006. In January 2007, Nazanin Fatehi was exonerated of murder charges and was released after Afshin-Jam raised $43,000 on-line for bail while her lawyers worked on her case. For her efforts in helping save Nazanin Fatehi, Afshin-Jam was awarded the "hero for human rights award" from Youth For Human Rights International and Artists for Human Rights. The Tale of Two Nazanins by Afshin-Jam and Susan McClelland, chronicling the divergent lives of the 2 Iranian Nazanins whose lives intersected during Fatehi's trial, was published by HarperCollins.

Afshin-Jam initiated the Stop Child Executions Campaign and petitioned to help children on death row; the campaign was registered as a non-profit organization with 501-C 3 status in 2008.  She is co-founder and President of the Stop Child Executions Organization, whose aim is to put a permanent end to executions of minors in Iran and abroad.

On September 23, 2008, Afshin-Jam organized "Ahmadinejad's Wall of Shame" rally at Dag Hammarskjöld park across the United Nations in New York as Ahmadinejad was addressing the General Assembly. In November 2008, Afshin-Jam received the "Global Citizenship Award" by the University of British Columbia's Alumni Association In April 2009, Afshin-Jam received the "Human Rights Hero Award" from UN Watch in Geneva, Switzerland.

In 2009 Afshin-Jam was given the Emerging Leader Peacemaker Award by the YMCA's Power of Peace Awards. That same year, Afshin-Jam signed an open letter of apology posted to Iranian.com along with 266 other Iranian academics, writers, artists, and journalists about the persecution of Baháʼís. That same year she chaired the first annual Geneva Summit for Human Rights and Democracy. In 2012, she advocated for the closure of the Canadian embassy in Tehran.

In 2012, Afshin-Jam received the Queen's Diamond Jubilee Medal. In 2016 she was conferred an honorary Doctor of Laws, honoris causa from the University of Western Ontario.

Film work
Afshin-Jam participated, together with eight other women's rights activists, in the documentary film Honor Diaries which explores the issues of gender-based violence and inequality in Muslim-majority societies. Her personal story was featured alongside those of the other activists, all of whom are working to combat gender prejudice that is embedded in honor-based societies.

She also took on the role of 'Shaggy Chick' in Scooby-Doo 2: Monsters Unleashed, where Matthew Lillard's face was attached to her body using CGI during a gag involving magic potions.

Music
Afshin-Jam's debut album, Someday was released in April 2007 by Bodog Music.  It spans many different music genres, including world music influenced by Alabina.

Several of Afshin-Jam's songs have made the Top 30 and Top 40 charts. Her debut single, "I Dance 4 U" charted at #20 in the Music Week - Commercial Pop Top 30 Club Chart (a music video for the song has been released). Afshim-Jam's single "Someday" has been climbing the FMQB Top 40 chart in the U.S. and is currently at #7. Her new single "I Do" reached #39 on the Billboard Chart in adult contemporary music. A Christmas single "On Christmas Day" has also made the charts, ranking #59 on the ACQB chart. The proceeds from the song are contributed to the Stop Child Executions Campaign.

Personal life 

A licensed pilot, Afshin-Jam flies both powered aircraft and gliders and achieved the highest rank in the Royal Canadian Air Cadets—Warrant Officer First Class. She was raised a Catholic and remains a practising one.

In 2011, she earned her Master of Arts in Diplomacy from Norwich University. On January 4, 2012, Afshin-Jam married Peter MacKay, then the Minister of Justice and Attorney General of Canada, at a private ceremony in Mexico. The couple have two sons, one named Kian, born in 2013 and another named Caledon, born in 2018  and one daughter named Valentia, born in 2015.

Bibliography

References

External links

Afshin-Jam's mini-doc from Honor Diaries film

1979 births
Living people
Canadian human rights activists
Women human rights activists
Female models from British Columbia
Canadian Roman Catholics
Iranian activists
Iranian emigrants to Canada
Iranian female models
21st-century Iranian women singers
Iranian Roman Catholics
Miss World 2003 delegates
Miss World Canada winners
Musicians from Vancouver
Naturalized citizens of Canada
Singers from Tehran
Spouses of Canadian politicians
University of British Columbia alumni
21st-century Canadian women singers